Salvia loxensis is a species of flowering plant in the family Lamiaceae that is native to Ecuador.
Its natural habitats are subtropical or tropical moist montane forests and subtropical or tropical high-altitude shrubland.

References

loxensis
Flora of Ecuador
Endangered plants
Taxonomy articles created by Polbot